Miles Armstrong and Sadik Kadir were the defending champions, but Armstrong chose to not participate this year. Kadir partnered up with Joseph Sirianni, but they lost 7–5, 5–7, [11–13] against Rameez Junaid and Daniel King-Turner in the first round.
Matthew Ebden and Samuel Groth won the title, defeating James Lemke and Dane Propoggia 6–7(8–10), 7–6(7–4), [10–8] in the final.

Seeds

Draw

Draw

External links
 Main Draw Doubles

McDonald's Burnie International - Doubles
Burnie International
2010 in Australian tennis